Angelo Schiavio (15 October 1905  – 17 September 1990) was an Italian footballer who played as a forward. Schiavio spent his entire career with Bologna, the club of the city where he was born and died; he won four league titles with the club, and is the team's all-time highest goalscorer. He won the 1934 FIFA World Cup with Italy, finishing as the tournament's second highest goalscorer; winning the 1927–30 Central European International Cup & 1933–35 Central European International Cup and he also won a bronze medal with Italy at the 1928 Summer Olympics. Following his retirement, he later also managed both Bologna and the Italian national side.

Regarded as one of Italy's greatest strikers, he was a quick, prolific, powerful, and technically gifted forward; in 2012, he was inducted into the Italian Football Hall of Fame.
 
Schiavo, who died on 17 September 1990 at the age of 84 in the Malpighi hospital of Bologna, was also the last surviving player from Italy's 1934 World Cup winning team.

Club career
Schiavio spent his entire career with Bologna. He began his career with the first team during the 1922–23 Prima Divisione, playing 6 league games (11 in total) and scoring 6 goals; he made his debut for the club in 1923, at the age of 17. At that time, the Italian league was organised into several different regional groups. He continued to play (and score) regularly for Bologna, breaking into the starting line-up permanently at the age of 19, and in 1925 Bologna won the first league championship in their history, while Schiavio contributed to the victory with 16 goals in 27 games. The last season played in this "grouped" format was the 1928–29 season; that season, Bologna won their second championship, with Schiavio averaging more than a goal per game with 30 goals in 26 games – his most prolific domestic campaign.

The 1929–30 season saw the advent of the Serie A format. Schiavio played in his first Serie A game away against Lazio on 6 October 1929 – a 3–0 loss for Bologna. His first goal in Serie A came on 13 November later that year, in a 2–2 draw at home to Triestina. In the 1931–32 season he scored 25 goals which led to him winning the Capocannonieri award for top scorer in Serie A. Bologna won two more Scudetti in 1936 and 1937, although Schiavio only played in two games in the latter victory. Schiavio's final season was in 1938–39, when he made 6 appearances in the league, but failed to score.

An important figure in the club's history, Schiavio spent 16 seasons with Bologna, winning four league titles. He made 361 appearances for the club in total, scoring 249 goals, and a club-record 242 goals in the Italian league, 109 of which were scored in the Italian Serie A format.

International career

Schiavio made his debut for the Italy national football team in November 1925, when he was 20 years old; he marked the occasion by scoring both goals in a 2–1 win over Yugoslavia in Padova. He participated in the 1928 Olympic Games, scoring 4 goals in 4 games as Italy won a bronze medal in the tournament.
He then went on to win the 1927–30 Central European International Cup & 1933–35 Central European International Cup.

Schiavio was also instrumental in Italy's first World Cup win in 1934. Supported by players such as Luis Monti and Giuseppe Meazza, he scored a total of 4 goals, finishing the tournament as the second highest scorer. FIFA originally credited Schiavio as one of three joint top scorers in the tournament (along with Czechoslovakia's Oldřich Nejedlý and Germany's Edmund Conen). However, FIFA revised this in November 2006, giving Nejedlý a fifth goal and the outright leading scorer title. Schiavio opened his account in the tournament with a hat-trick in the opening game against the USA on 27 May, which included Italy's first ever World Cup goal; the match eventually ended in a 7–1 win to the Italians. Despite his prolific display in Italy's opener, he was not able to score in any of the next two games Italy played in order to reach the final.

In the final, Czechoslovakia took the lead, but a late goal by Raimundo Orsi levelled the game. In the 5th minute of extra-time, despite carrying an injury, Schiavio converted a cross by Enrique Guaita – this goal ultimately proved decisive as the final score was 2–1; following the goal, he briefly fainted due to fatique. This was Schiavio's final goal and game for Italy, as injury struggles kept him out of the team.

In total Schiavio gained 21 caps for the national team, scoring 15 goals.

Style of play
Regarded as one of Italy's greatest strikers, and one of Bologna's greatest players ever, Schiavio was 178 cm tall and weighed 69 kg; he made his name as a quick and powerful centre-forward, with good technique and dribbling skills. He was also known for his pace, reactions, and offensive movement, which enabled him to lose his markers and make runs to beat the defensive line and get on the end of passes. A prolific goalscorer, he was an accurate and powerful finisher with both feet and he often used physical force to score goals. Moreover, he was a generous and versatile team-player, and was known for his willingness to play in several other offensive positions, including as a left winger, or even as an inside forward on occasion, which was known as the mezzala role at the time in Italian football jargon. Despite his ability, however, he also struggled with injuries throughout his career.

Career statistics

Club

International

Honours

Club
Bologna
Serie A: 1924–25, 1928–29, 1935–36, 1936–37
Mitropa Cup: 1932, 1934
International Trophy of the Universal Expo of Paris: 1937

International
Italy
FIFA World Cup: 1934
Central European International Cup: 1927–30, 1933–35
Summer Olympics: Bronze 1928

Individual
Serie A Capocannoniere: 1931–32 (25 goals)
FIFA World Cup Silver Boot: 1934
Italian Football Hall of Fame: 2012 (posthumous)

References

External links
 Sports Illustrated World Cup Hall of Fame
 
 Angelo Schiavio National Team Statistics from the RSSSF
 
 
 
 
 

1905 births
1990 deaths
Footballers from Bologna
Bologna F.C. 1909 players
1934 FIFA World Cup players
FIFA World Cup-winning players
Footballers at the 1928 Summer Olympics
Italian footballers
Italy international footballers
Olympic bronze medalists for Italy
Olympic footballers of Italy
Serie A players
Olympic medalists in football
Medalists at the 1928 Summer Olympics
Association football forwards